Christian Hochstätter (born 19 October 1963) is a German former professional footballer. He is a nephew of Helmut Haller.

Club career 
He appeared in more than 330 (West) German top-flight matches.

International career 
Hochstätter played in two friendlies for West Germany in December 1987 – against Brazil and Argentina.

Post-playing career 
After his playing career he was director of football for Borussia Mönchengladbach from 1999 to 2005 and for Hannover 96 from 2006 to 2009.

In June 2013, Hochstätter was hired as sports director at VfL Bochum.

Honours
 DFB-Pokal winner: 1994–95
 DFB-Pokal finalist: 1983–84, 1991–92

References

External links
 
 
 

1963 births
Living people
German footballers
Germany international footballers
Germany under-21 international footballers
Borussia Mönchengladbach players
Bundesliga players
Sportspeople from Augsburg
Association football midfielders
Footballers from Bavaria
West German footballers